Seo Ji-hee (born April 4, 1998) is a South Korean actress.

Filmography

Television series

Film

Awards and nominations

References

External links
 
 Seo Ji-hee Fan Cafe at Daum
 
 

1998 births
Living people
South Korean television actresses
South Korean film actresses
South Korean child actresses
School of Performing Arts Seoul alumni
21st-century South Korean actresses